SnapLogic is a commercial software company that provides integration platform as a service (iPaaS) tools for connecting cloud data sources, SaaS applications and on-premises business software applications. SnapLogic was founded in 2006, and its headquarters are in San Mateo, CA. SnapLogic is headed by Ex-CEO and co-founder of Informatica Gaurav Dhillon, and is venture backed by Andreessen Horowitz, Ignition Partners, Floodgate Fund, Brian McClendon, and Naval Ravikant.

On December 10, 2015, SnapLogic announced a $37.5 million funding round led by Microsoft and Silver Lake Waterman along with existing investors Andreessen Horowitz, Ignition Partners, and Triangle Peak Partners.

As of 2019, the company has raised $208.3 million.

Products
SnapLogic's Elastic Integration Platform consists of an Integration Cloud, prebuilt connectors called Snaps and a Snaplex for data processing in the cloud or behind the firewall. The company's products have been referred to as targeting the Internet of Things marketplace for connecting data, applications and devices.
 
The Integration Cloud approaches big data integration through the following tools:
 
 Designer:  An HTML5-based user interface for specifying and building integration workflows, called pipelines.
 Manager: Controls and monitors the performance of SnapLogic orchestrations and administers the lifecycle of data and process flows.
 Dashboards: Provides visibility into the health of integrations, including performance, reliability, and utilization.

The Snaplex is a self-upgrading, elastic execution grid that streams data between applications, databases, files, social and big data sources. The Snaplex can run in the cloud, behind the firewall and on Hadoop.
 
Snaps are modular collections of integration components built for a specific application or data source and are available for analytics and big data sources, identity management, social media, online storage, ERP, databases and technologies such as XML, JSON, Oauth, SOAP, and REST. Snap Patterns was introduced in March 2014 to help with connecting cloud services like Amazon Redshift, Salesforce.com, Workday and ServiceNow, both with each other and with on-premises applications, databases and files. The company's Winter 2015 release focused on adding tighter security and added support for Hadoop and big data integration to its product line.

Awards and media
 AlwaysOn Global 250 Winner
 The Companies That Matter Most in Data 
 Sand Hill 50 "Agile and Innovative" in Cloud 
 EMA Vendor to Watch

See also
 Data integration
 Extract, transform, and load (ETL)
 Software as a service (SaaS)
 Cloud computing
 Enterprise application integration
 iPaaS

References

Further reading

External links
 Official website

Development software companies
Extract, transform, load tools
Enterprise software
Enterprise application integration
Cloud computing providers
Cloud applications